J. Dallett Byers (January 20, 1898 – December 23, 1966) was an American jockey and Thoroughbred racehorse trainer. He was inducted into the National Museum of Racing and Hall of Fame in 1967.

References

1898 births
1966 deaths
American jockeys
American horse trainers
People from Chester County, Pennsylvania